Rock Dust Light Star is the seventh studio album released by the English band Jamiroquai. The album was released on 1 November 2010 in the United Kingdom by Universal Music/Mercury Records and on 24 April 2012 in the United States by Executive Music Group.

Background
The album was recorded at Jay Kay's home studio in Buckinghamshire, as well as Hook End Manor in Oxfordshire, and Karma Studios in Thailand. The album is written entirely by the band, and produced by first time collaborators Charlie Russell and Brad Spence. The band revealed that the musical style of the new album will be more centred on funk and rock; however, frontman Jay Kay claimed that the tone and style of the album were hard for him to describe. Promotion of the album began in October 2010, with a press conference involving band members Jay Kay, Derrick McKenzie, Sola Akingbola, Matt Johnson, Paul Turner, and Rob Harris. They announced that the group were to play two concerts, in Colombia and Brazil, to promote the album, before discussing plans for a possible world tour in 2011. In a review for The Daily Telegraph, the album was described as "blistering, poetic, meaty, reflective and inspiring". For this album, Kay took inspiration from Rod Stewart, Roxy Music, Pink Floyd and the Rolling Stones "in their more rock/disco phase".

Reception

Upon release, the album debuted at number seven on the UK Albums Chart with sales of about 34,378 copies. As of December 2010, the album has sold 210,000 copies worldwide. On 17 December 2010, the album was certified Gold in the UK for reaching sales of 100,000 copies. In March 2011, Jamiroquai announced plans for the speculated worldwide tour, starting with dates Hallenstadion in Zurich on 18 March 2011, and ending with two shows at the SECC in Glasgow on 20 April 2011. In June 2011, another string of tour dates were confirmed on the band's website for June and July.

Outtakes
Although a total of 30 songs were recorded for the album, according to Kay, only 15 tracks appeared across all editions of the album. A video for the album, posted just before release, showed recording of the tracks "I've Been Working" and "Super Highway"; however, none of these appeared on the final track listing. "All Mixed Up in You" appeared as a working title for "Angeline", released as a bonus track in the deluxe version of the album.
Upon the album being made available to pre-order, several retail websites listed the standard album containing thirteen tracks, with track No. 8 called "Your Window Is a Crazy Television". However, upon the album appearing in stores, the track was nowhere to be seen. On 2 June 2011, a competition began to design artwork for a brand-new Jamiroquai single, "Smile", an outtake from Rock Dust Light Star. On 9 June, the winner of the competition was announced, and the song was initially made available for free download via SoundCloud and was later published for free download on music journalism sites such as Earmilk.

Track listing

Japanese bonus track
 "That's Not the Funk" – 3:22

Deluxe Edition bonus tracks
 "All Good in the Hood" (acoustic version) – 3:39
 "Angeline" (McKenzie, Kay, Harris) – 3:29
 "Hang It Over" (Kay, Harris) – 4:50
 "Rock Dust Light Star" (live) – 5:42
 "White Knuckle Ride" (Alan Braxe remix) – 3:17
 "Blue Skies" (Fred Falke remix) – 4:08

Personnel
Adapted from the Jamiroquai Universal website.

 Malcolm Strachan – trumpet, flugelhorn
 Jim Corry – saxophone
 James Russell – saxophone, flute
 Matt Johnson – keyboards
 Rob Harris – guitar
 Paul Turner – bass guitar
 Simon Hale – strings
 Derrick McKenzie – drums
 Sola Akingbola – percussion
 Jay Kay – vocals
 Valerie Etienne – background vocals
 Hazel Fernandez – background vocals
 Kate Sutherland – background vocals on 'Rock Dust Light Star' Live Version

Charts

Weekly charts

Year-end charts

Certifications

References

2010 albums
Jamiroquai albums